Antonino Profeta (born 26 June 1988) is an Italian forward, currently on the books of Pergocrema.

Caps on Italian Series 

Serie C1 : 29 caps

Serie C2 : 16 caps

Serie D : 29 caps, 1 goal

Total : 74 caps, 1 goal

External links
Profile at lega-calcio.it

1988 births
Living people
Association football midfielders
Cosenza Calcio players
Italian footballers
Potenza S.C. players
U.S. Pergolettese 1932 players
U.S. Siracusa players